Aegomorphus contaminatus is a species of beetle in the family Cerambycidae. It was described by Thomson in 1865.

References

Aegomorphus
Beetles described in 1865